Syed Ruknuddin Ahmad is an Indian politician and member of 17th Legislative Assembly of Bihar. He represents the Baisi (Vidhan Sabha constituency) in Purnia district of Bihar. He was a member of All India Majlis-e-Ittehadul Muslimeen (AIMIM). He joined Rashtriya Janata Dal in 2022.

References 

Living people
Bihar MLAs 2020–2025
All India Majlis-e-Ittehadul Muslimeen politicians
Year of birth missing (living people)